The 2020 African U-17 Women's World Cup Qualifying Tournament was the 7th edition of the African U-17 Women's World Cup Qualifying Tournament, the biennial international youth football competition organised by the Confederation of African Football (CAF) to determine which women's under-17 national teams from Africa qualify for the FIFA U-17 Women's World Cup. Players born on or after 1 January 2003 were eligible to compete in the tournament.

Three teams would have qualified from this tournament for the 2021 FIFA U-17 Women's World Cup (originally 2020 but postponed due to COVID-19 pandemic) in India as the CAF representatives. However, FIFA announced on 17 November 2020 that this edition of the World Cup would be cancelled. As a result, all remaining qualifying matches were cancelled.

Draw
A total of 20 (out of 54) CAF member national teams entered the qualifying rounds. The draw was held on 10 May  2020 at the CAF headquarters in Cairo, Egypt.

In the preliminary round, the 16 teams were drawn into eight ties, with teams divided into four pots based on their geographical zones and those in the same pot drawn to play against each other.
In the first round, the eight preliminary round winners and the four teams receiving byes to the first round were allocated into six ties based on the preliminary round tie numbers, with four preliminary round winners playing against the four teams receiving byes, and the other four preliminary round winners playing against each other.
In the second round, the six first round winners were allocated into three ties based on the first round tie numbers.

Notes
Teams in bold qualified for the World Cup.
(W): Withdrew after draw

Did not enter

Format
Qualification ties were played on a home-and-away two-legged basis. If the aggregate score was tied after the second leg, the away goals rule was applied, and if still tied, the penalty shoot-out (no extra time) was used to determine the winner.

Schedule
The schedule of the qualifying rounds was as follows.

Due to the COVID-19 pandemic, all second round matches, originally scheduled for 1–3 and 8–10 May 2020, had been postponed until further notice. The CAF announced the new dates in July 2020. However, in October 2020, CAF announced that all third round matches, rescheduled for 30 October – 1 November and 20–22 November 2020, were again postponed due to travel restrictions across parts of Africa as a result of COVID-19. The CAF sent a letter to the member associations on 21 December 2020 confirming the cancellation of the qualifiers.

Bracket
The three winners of the second round would have qualified for the 2021 FIFA U-17 Women's World Cup.

Preliminary round

|}

Zambia won on walkover after Namibia withdrew, citing financial constraints.

Botswana won 7–0 on aggregate.

Morocco won 14–0 on aggregate.

Tanzania won 6–1 on aggregate.

Uganda won 5–1 on aggregate.

São Tomé and Príncipe won on walkover after DR Congo did not appear for the first leg.

Liberia won 9–0 on aggregate.

Guinea won 8–3 on aggregate.

First round

|}

South Africa won 3–2 on aggregate.

Morocco won 4–0 on aggregate and awarded as a 3–0 after Botswana did not appear for the second leg due to concerns of the COVID-19 pandemic.Uganda won 6–2 on aggregate.Cameroon won 10–0 on aggregate.Ghana won 10–0 on aggregate.Nigeria won 11–1 on aggregate.''

Second round
Winners would have qualified for 2021 FIFA U-17 Women's World Cup.

|}

Goalscorers

Notes

References

2020
Women's U-17 World Cup Qualifying Tournament
African U-17 World Cup Qualifying Tournament
African U-17 Women's World Cup Qualifying Tournament
2020 FIFA U-17 Women's World Cup qualification
January 2020 sports events in Africa
February 2020 sports events in Africa
March 2020 sports events in Africa
Association football events curtailed and voided due to the COVID-19 pandemic